Rackets or racquets is an indoor racket sport played in the United Kingdom, United States, and Canada. The sport is infrequently called "hard rackets", to distinguish it from the related sport of squash (also called "squash rackets").

History 

Historians generally assert that rackets began as an 18th-century pastime in London's King's Bench and Fleet debtors' prisons. The prisoners modified the game of fives (in the process creating Bat Fives) by using tennis rackets to speed up the action. They played against the prison wall, sometimes at a corner to add a sidewall to the game. Rackets then became popular outside the prison, played in alleys behind pubs. It spread to schools, first using school walls, and later with proper four-wall courts being specially constructed for the game. The lithograph at right from the late 1700s shows school boys 'hitting up' outside the Harrow School 'Old School' buildings.

Eglinton Castle in Scotland, now largely demolished, had a "Racket Hall" which is first shown on the 1860 OS map, but estate records show that it was built shortly after 1839, the first recorded match being in 1846. The floor is of large granite slabs, now hidden by the wooden floor. It is the very first covered racket court and is now the oldest surviving court in the world, as well as being the oldest indoor sports building in Scotland. It has been restored as a racket hall, but used as an exhibition area. Some private clubs also built courts. Along with real tennis and badminton, rackets was used as an inspiration for the game of lawn tennis, which Walter Clopton Wingfield claimed he invented in 1873, but this was not so, as others had been playing lawn tennis since as early as 1859, including J.B. Perera and Harry Gem. Wingfield did obtain a patent on his proposed peculiarly-shaped "hourglass" lawn tennis court in 1874, but it lasted in use no more than a year before it was shelved by the Marylebone Cricket Club's 1875 official rules mandating the rectangular court in use both before and after Wingfield's hourglass court. A vacant rackets court built into the University of Chicago's Stagg Field served as the location of the first artificial nuclear chain reaction on December 2, 1942. The Stagg Field court is often mistakenly identified as having been a "squash rackets" court. Rackets was part of the 1908 Summer Olympics program and was played at the Prince's Club in London; the winner was Evan Noel.

After the second world war rackets saw a drop in popularity resulting in the closure of some courts and others suffering from a lack of maintenance. Dick Bridgeman, an advocate for the sport (and later a British Doubles Champion) established what was then the Dick Bridgeman Tennis and Rackets Foundation. The foundation sought donations to support young professionals thereby ensuring the future of the game.  Now known as simply The Tennis and Racquets Foundation, it continues to raise money for young professionals raising the profile of rackets worldwide.

The Book of Racquets was published by J. R. Atkins in 1872. It was reprinted to commemorate the 1981 World Rackets Challenge Match between W. J. C. Surtees and J. A. N. Prenn as a limited edition of 250 copies.

Manner of play 

Singles and doubles are played on the same court. The walls and floor of the court are made of smooth stone or concrete and are generally dark in colour to contrast with the white ball. A player uses a  wooden racket, known as a bat, to hit a 1½-inch (38 mm) hard white ball weighing . As of September 2018, two companies produce rackets racquets, Grays of Cambridge (UK) and Gold Leaf Athletics (US).

The ball may touch the side walls before reaching the front wall. The player returning a good stroke may play the ball on the volley, or after one bounce on the floor. The play is fast, and potentially dangerous. Lets (replayed points) are common, as the striker should not play the ball if doing so risks hitting another player with it. Matches preferably are observed by a "marker", who has the duty to call "Play" after each good stroke to denote that the ball is "up". Games are to 15 points, unless the game is tied at 13–all or 14–all, in which case the game can be "set" to 16 or 18 (in the case of 13–all) or to 15 or 17 (in the case of 14–all) at the option of the player first reaching 13 or 14. Only the server (hand-in) can score—the receiver (hand-out) who wins a rally becomes the server. Return of service can be extremely difficult, and, in North America, only one serve is allowed. Matches are typically best of five games.

The main shots played are the volley, forehand and the backhand all similar to the way one plays these in squash; because the game of squash rackets (now known as "squash") began in the 19th century as an offshoot of rackets, the sports were similar in manner of play and rules. However, the rules and scoring in squash have evolved in the last hundred years or so. Rackets has changed little; the main difference today is that players are now allowed brief rest periods between games. In the past, leaving the court could mean forfeiting the match, so players kept spare rackets, shirts, and shoes in the gutter below the telltale on the front wall.
The governing bodies are the Tennis and Rackets Association (UK) and the North American Racquets Association.

Court locations

United Kingdom 

As of this date, there are about twenty courts in some of the major public schools and private clubs in the United Kingdom.

Schools

Two court venues

 Charterhouse School
 Eton College
 Harrow School
 Malvern College
 Marlborough College
 Rugby School
 Tonbridge School
  Winchester College

One court venues

 Cheltenham College
 Clifton College
 Haileybury
 Radley College
 St Paul's School (London)
 Wellington College

Clubs 
As of this date, the known club courts are as follows.  Here, the number of courts appear in parentheses.

 BRNC Dartmouth (1)
 Hayling Island (1)
 Manchester Tennis & Racket Club (1)
 Queens Club, London (2)
 RMA Sandhurst (1)

Clifton College was recently refurbished, to be suitable to host world championships. There are also private clubs that the public may join, and a nomadic club, The Jesters.

North America 

As of this date, there are eight active courts in North America, all at private clubs:

Two court venues
 Chicago. The Racquet Club of Chicago has two courts. Opened in 1924, with a Court Tennis and two double squash courts.  The courts are in exceptional condition, and have hosted the prestigious Western Open and other tournaments multiple times. The lobby of the courts contains plaques with the names of yearly winners going back to 1924.  This club is open to both Men and Women and features many other gym facilities.  It is known as one of the most exclusive clubs in the Chicago area.  There are multiple dining and social areas, including a billiards room for social events.

One court venues
 Detroit.  The Detroit Racquet Club, also referred to as the DRC, opened in 1902 as the 'Detroit Racquet and Curling Club'. The building was designed by the noted architect Albert Kahn, and was built by the construction company owned by Joseph Bickley; its two original curling lanes were sold off during the Great Depression. The DRC is a proper Gentlemen's club, and hosts three additional North American squash courts. The Rackets court was originally open to the air with natural lighting until it was glazed over with lights added in 1912. The home colors are dark navy blue and white.

 The  club is reportedly the origin to the cocktail the stinger which has been a mainstay at the club since opening.

 Montreal. The first court was built in 1825. The Montreal Rackets Club (founded in 1889) is the oldest in existence according to Alastair Bruce, 5th Baron Aberdare, whose father won the championship there in 1930. The court was constructed four feet longer and two feet wider to facilitate doubles play. It was resized to regulation 60 by 30 feet in 1909.
 New York, NY. The New York Racquet and Tennis Club opened in 1918 on Park Avenue, the building designed by McKim, Mead & White. The building originally housed two courts: one was converted to a double squash court in 1956.  It is one of the remaining large clubs with a male only policy. The first court in the city was built in 1850 by a wine merchant from Montreal, Mr E.H. Lamontagne. The Racket and squash professional is Mr. James Stout, who retired the unbeaten World Champion.
 Philadelphia. Opened in 1907 with three courts, one of which now has been converted to a double squash court, and another to a single squash court, at The Racquet Club of Philadelphia.
 Tuxedo Park, NY. Opened in 1902.  The Tuxedo Park courts are part of a large private gated community which hosts many tournaments bringing in players from all around the world.
 Boston, MA. The Boston Tennis and Racquet Club opened in 1902 in Boston's Back Bay in a building designed by Parker and Thomas in the classical revival style and built by Frank L. Whitcomb.

Tournaments 

The Rackets World Championships for singles (and doubles) is decided in a challenge format. If the governing bodies accept the challenger's qualifications, he plays the reigning champion in a best of 14 games format (best of seven games on each side of the Atlantic). If each player wins seven games, the total point score is used as a tie breaker. The current singles champion is Tom Billings who defeated Alex Duncliffe-Vines in 2019. There will be another Challenge in November 2022 between Billings and the current World number 1 Ben Cawston.

The current Doubles world champions are Tom Billings and Richard Owen who defeated James Stout and Jonathan Larken in 2021, 5-1 at Queen’s and New York. In 2016 James Stout & Jonathan Larken,  beat World Title holders, Alex Titchener-Barrett and Christian Portz in a two-legged challenge in November 2016. The first leg was played in London's Queen's Club, and was won by the challengers 4 games to 1. The second occurred in The New York Racquet's and Tennis Club, and was also won by the challengers 2 games to 1, reaching a two match aggregate of six games.

There are various tournaments that are hosted in North America and the UK.

These are:

 In North America

 The Canadian Amateur Championships
 The US Amateur Championships
 The US Open
 The Western Open
 The Tuxedo Gold Rackets
 The North American Invitational Singles

 In the UK

 The British Amateur Singles
 The British Amateur Doubles
 The British Open Singles
 The British Open Doubles (Separate tournament from Singles, played at a different time of year)
 The Invitational Singles
 The Manchester Gold Racket
 The National Schools Championship - Contested by players still at school in two tournaments, across 3 age groups, Singles and Doubles, both held at Queen's Club.
 The National Schools Girls Championship - Contested by players still at school in two tournaments, across 2 age groups, Singles and Doubles, both held at Queen's Club.

World champions

Organised on a challenge basis, the first champion in 1820 was Robert Mackay of England. All championships were closed court, except for an open court series, in 1860.

1820-1824  Robert Mackay
1825-1834  Thomas Pittman
1834-1838  John Pittman
1838-1840  John Lamb
1846-1860  John Charles Mitchell
1860–1862  Francis Erwood
1862-1863  William Hart-Dyke
1863-1866  Henry John Gray
1866-1875  William Gray
1876-1878  Henry B Fairs
1878-1887  Joseph Gray
1887–1902  Peter Latham
1903–1911  Jamsetji Merwanji
1911–1913  Charles Williams
1913–1929  Jock Soutar
1929–1935  Charles Williams
1937–1947  David S Milford
1947–1954  James Dear
1954–1972  Geoffrey Atkins
1972–1973  William Surtees
1973–1975 Howard Angus MBE
1975–1981  William Surtees
1981–1984  John Prenn
1984–1986  William Boone
1986–1988  John Prenn
1988–1999  James Male
1999–2001  Neil Smith
2001–2005  James Male (retired)
2005–2008  Harry Foster
2008–2019  James Stout (retired)
2019–Present  Tom Billings

References

Further reading
 Squires, Dick. The Other Racket Sports. New York: McGraw-Hill, 1978. .
 Lord Aberdare. The JT Faber Book of Tennis and Rackets. London: Quiller Press, 2001. .

External links 
 Tennis and Rackets Association
 

 
Racket sports
Individual sports
Indoor sports
Ball games
Former Summer Olympic sports
Sports originating in England